Narendra Nath (1935–1998) was an Indian actor.

Early life and background 

His full name is Narendra Nath Malhotra. He was first cousin of actor Prithviraj Kapoor. Prithviraj's mother was the elder sister of Narendra's father. Two of his brothers were also actors, being the late Prem Nath and Rajendra Nath. Prem Nath was married to the actress Bina Rai. Narendra also had two sisters. His elder sister, Krishna, was the widow of the legendary Raj Kapoor and the matriarch of a large family of film personalities. His other sister, Uma, is the wife of actor Prem Chopra.

Filmography

 Khofnak Mahal (1998)
 Aakhri Sanghursh (1997) - Shekhar
 Hind Ki Beti  (1996)
 Pyar Do Pyar Lo  (1995) 
 Mere Data Garib Nawaz  (1994) 
 Zee Horror Show (1993) - Dastak Episode  as Ramdin (servant)
 Veerta (1993) 
 Ajooba (1991) -  Sharafat Khan Bandit
 Farishtay (1991) - (Guest Appearance)
 Deewana Mujh Sa Nahin (1990) - Anita's uncle
 Zimmedaaar (1990) Viju's partner 
 Desh Ke Dushman (1989) - Jagga
 Purani Haveli (1989) - Nareen
 Sau Saal Baad  (1989)
 Jeete Hain Shaan Se (1988) 
 Veerana (1988) - Psychiatrist 
 Diljalaa (1987) - Mehra
 Dak Bangla (1987) 
 Maa Baap (1987)
 Jwala  (1986) - Saudamal
 Tahkhana (1986) - Dhurjan Singh
 Adventures of Tarzan (1985) -Krishnakant Verma
 Haveli (1985)  
 Surkhiyaan (The Headlines) (1985) - Jaggu
 Sitamgar (1985) Kundan 
 Ramkali (1985) - Rasulla
 Ram Tere Kitne Nam (1985) - Naren
 Lava (1985) - Nath
 Ganga Ke Paar (1985) 
 Jawaani (1984) - Vishnu Dada
 Maan Maryada (1984) - Bhura Singh
 Rakta Bandhan (1984) - Ranga 
 Chor Police (1983) - Prakash
 Haadsa (1983) Police Inspector 
 Pukar (1983)
 Qayamat (1983) - Lobo
 Kaun? Kaisey? (1983)
 Jeeo Aur Jeene Do (1982) 
 Insaan (1982) -  
 Meharbaani (1982)
 Ashanti (1982) - Sampat
 Adhura Aadmi (1982)
 Kachche Heere (1982) - Jaggu
 Prohari  (1982) -  
 Professor Pyarelal (1981) - Sammy's associate
 Raksha (1982)- Jagat Baba
 Aapas Ki Baat (1981) - Bosco
 Hotel (1981) - Girdharilal
 Dahshat (1981)- Inspector Verma
 Jwala Daku (1981)- Mangal
 Parakh (1981)
 Bambai Ka Maharaja  (1980)
 Guest House (1980 film) (1980)- John 
 Qurbani (1980)- Traffic Cop
 Lootmaar (1980)
 Saboot (1980) Ashok Gupta
 Bebus (1979)
 Chambal Ki Rani (1979)
 Heera-Moti (1979)
 Chambal Ki Rani (1979) Dracula
 Janta Hawaldar (1979)
 Chor Sipahee (1979) Inspector Apte
 Mahi Munda (1979)
 Habari (1979)
 Daku Aur Mahatma (1977)
 Hira Aur Patthar (1977) Pratap Singh
 Khel Khilari Ka (1977) Sangram Singh's Son
 "Maa baap" (Gujarati) (1977)
 Deewaangee (1976) Munne Khan
 Koi Jeeta Koi Haara (1976)  
 Rani Aur Lalpari (1975) 
 Vardaan (1975) 
 Rafoo Chakkar (1975) Himself
 Dharam Karam (1975) Ranjit A. Kumar
 Kala Sona (1975) Hukam Singh
 Vandana (1975) Badal
 Khhotte Sikkay (1974) Jaggu dada
 Love in Bombay (1974) 
 Woh Main Nahin (1974) Vishwambhar
 Mr. Romeo (1974) Prem Pal
 Aaj Ki Taaza Khabar (1973) Capt. Ranjeet Goel
 Anamika (1973) Ganga Prasad Malhotra
 Hifazat (1973)  
 Kora Anchal (1973)  
 Gharibi Hatao (1973)  
 Rani Aur Jaani (1973) Bhavani Singh
 Jangal Mein Mangal (1972) Baldev
 Jawani Diwani (1972) Benny
 Ganga Tera Pani Amrit (1971)
 Sharmeelee (1971) Tiger
 Kal Aaj Aur Kal (1971) Hamid
 Sawan Bhadon (1970) 
 Jahan Pyar Mile (1969) 
 Amrapali (1966) Lord Buddha

 as Assistant Director 
 Prince (1969) 
 Jhuk Gaya Aasman (1968) 
 Amrapali (1966)

References

External links
 

Indian male film actors
Male actors in Hindi cinema
20th-century Indian male actors
Place of birth missing
1935 births
1998 deaths
Male actors from Madhya Pradesh